Carshalton and Wallington is a constituency (also known as a seat) represented in the House of Commons of the Parliament of the United Kingdom since 2019 by Elliot Colburn, a Conservative.

The seat was created at the 1983 general election, replacing the former seat of Carshalton.

Political history

From 1997 to 2010 Liberal Democrat majorities were between 2.5% and 15%, contextually marginal in the light of local political history. The large national swing against the Conservatives in 1997 of −11.2% compared to −16.2% expressed locally. This ended the seat's spell of three widely perceived "strong" or "safe" victories – the weakest lead seen by outgoing MP Forman was 18.9% in 1992. Results since 2015 have been very marginal majorities.

The Liberal Democrats 2010 to 2015 coalition proved very unpopular in most other places prompting an unprecedented swing against the party nationally. The coalition saw no meeting of the party's tuition fees abolition policy and a quite austere credit crunch recovery in fiscal policy. No other seat in the southern half of England, aside from North Norfolk (on its fringe), was retained by a Liberal Democrat in 2015. The seat became one of eight connected to the party. The result placed the seat ahead of seats the party lost that had returned a Liberal Democrat or Liberal for decades, such as Truro and St Austell, its member (or that for its direct predecessor version, Truro) having had the party's allegiance since 1974. In 2019, this seat was one of three Liberal Democrat seats gained by the Conservatives (albeit two went the other way). Brake, the losing incumbent was party spokesman on Brexit. The party fiercely campaigned against this; however, this seat voted to leave in the 2016 referendum.

Demographically this zone of London has little social housing and much of the housing, overwhelmingly semi-detached or detached, is to some extent considered to be in the stockbroker belt; some of the south of the seat has fine views from the slopes of the Downs and many small parks and recreation grounds characterise the district.

Boundaries 

1983–2010: The London Borough of Sutton wards of Beddington North, Beddington South, Carshalton Beeches, Carshalton Central, Carshalton North, Clockhouse, St Helier North, St Helier South, Wallington North, Wallington South, Wandle Valley, Woodcote, and Wrythe Green.

2010–present: The London Borough of Sutton wards of Beddington North, Beddington South, Carshalton Central, Carshalton South and Clockhouse, St Helier, The Wrythe, Wallington North, Wallington South, and Wandle Valley.

Members of Parliament

Election results

Elections in the 2010s

Elections in the 2000s

Elections in the 1990s

Elections in the 1980s

See also 
 List of parliamentary constituencies in London

Notes

References

External links 
nomis Constituency Profile for Carshalton and Wallington — presenting data from the ONS annual population survey and other official statistics.
Politics Resources (Election results from 1922 onwards)
Electoral Calculus (Election results from 1955 onwards)

Politics of the London Borough of Sutton
Parliamentary constituencies in London
Constituencies of the Parliament of the United Kingdom established in 1983
Carshalton